Episomus pyriformis is a species of weevil found in Sri Lanka.

Description
This species has a body length is about 9.5 to 11.5 mm. Body greyish brown. Margins of elytra are paler. Sometimes there are traces of metallic green scales. Head with a deep narrow furrow. Rostrum broad, and slightly dilated towards apex. Prothorax as long as broad, and cylindrical. Scutellum small and round. Elytra pear-shaped. Legs with uniform pale scales.

References 

Curculionidae
Insects of Sri Lanka
Beetles described in 1916